The Diocese of Kalgoorlie was a diocese of the Church of England in Australia (now the Anglican Church of Australia). It covered much of the Goldfields-Esperance region in Western Australia, and existed from the consecration of its first bishop in 1914 until its re-absorption back into the Anglican Diocese of Perth in 1973. At that point the Kalgoorlie diocese was reported to contain only eight parishes, and was financially unviable as a separate entity.

The cathedral was St John the Baptist, Kalgoorlie, which before and after the separate existence of the diocese was the parish church of Kalgoorlie.

Bishops

References

Former Anglican dioceses in Australia
Province of Western Australia